Yitzhak Kroizer (born 7 September 1985) is an Israeli politician currently serving as a Member of the Knesset for Otzma Yehudit.

Biography 
Kroizer is the son of Yehuda Kroizer, The local rabbi in Mitzpe Yeriho and the leader of Yeshivat Haraayon Hayehudi, an organization founded by Meir Kahane. He served in the Israel Defense Forces and fought in the Second Lebanon War. In 2007, two of his brothers died in a car accident. Before entering politics, Kroizer was a farmer, and later ran a construction company. 

Kroizer is a member of Otzma Yehudit, and was given the fourth spot on its list in 2020. He was not elected as the party won no seats. In 2022, Kroizer was given fifteenth spot the party's joint list with the Religious Zionist Party and Noam ahead of that year's election. Kroizer was not elected as the list won 14 seats, but entered the Knesset on 1 January 2023 following the resignation of Amihai Eliyahu as part of the Norwegian Law.

Personal Life 
Kroizer is married and has three children. He resides in Natur.

References

External links

Members of the Knesset
Otzma Yehudit politicians
Living people
1985 births